Robert Royce "Bob" Johnson (1928–2016) was an American inventor, engineer, computer pioneer, and professor.  Besides the Johnson counter, a type of ring counter that was named for him, he developed the method of encoding numbers on checks still in use as of 2018.

References

1928 births
2016 deaths
20th-century American inventors